Bagoas (died 336 BC) was a Persian minister of Artaxerxes III.

Bagoas, meaning eunuch, may also refer to:

 Bagoas (courtier), a favourite of Alexander the Great
 Bagoas the Persian, 5th-century governor of the Achaemenid province of Yehud, known from the Elephantine papyri
 An Assyrian eunuch, servant of the general Holofernes in the Book of Judith
 Abrial A-12 Bagoas, a French experimental glider of the 1930s

See also
 Bagous, a genus of beetle